Zhang Wenbin (张文彬) is the name of the following Chinese people:

 Zhang Wenbin (vice minister) (1919–2013), Vice Minister of the Petroleum Industry
 Zhang Wenbin (Chongqing politician) (born 1934), CPPCC Chairman of Chongqing
 Zhang Wenbin (archaeologist) (1937–2019), Director of the National Cultural Heritage Administration
  (1910-1944), see Secretary-general of the Communist Party of China